Miners Shot Down is a 2014 South African documentary film directed by Rehad Desai. This film explores the events that led to what was called the "Marikana Massacre". In 2015, the film won an International Emmy.

References

Further reading 
 Managing public feeling: Temporality, mourning and the Marikana Massacre in Rehad Desai’s Miners Shot Down by Helene Strauss, Critical Arts, 2016

External links 
 Miners Shot Down at IMDb

2014 films
South African documentary films
2014 documentary films